Leicestershire is a county in the East Midlands of England with an area of , and a population according to the 2011 census of 980,000. Leicester City Council is a unitary authority, and the rest of the county is administered by Leicestershire County Council at the top level, with seven district councils in the second tier, Blaby, Charnwood, Harborough, Hinckley and Bosworth, Melton, North West Leicestershire and Oadby and Wigston.

In England, Sites of Special Scientific Interest (SSSIs) are designated by Natural England, a non-departmental public body which is responsible for protecting England's natural environment. Designation as an SSSI gives legal protection to the most important wildlife and geological sites. As of January 2018, there are seventy-six SSSIs in the county, fifty-seven of which are designated for their biology, twelve for their geology and seven for both criteria.

There are nineteen Geological Conservation Review sites, six Nature Conservation Review sites, one Special Area of Conservation, three national nature reserves, two are common land, and three contain scheduled monuments. One site is a local nature reserve, thirteen are managed by the Leicestershire and Rutland Wildlife Trust, and one by the National Trust. It has rocks dating to the Ediacaran period around 600 million years ago, and is very important for the study of Precambrian palaeontology.

Key

Interest
B = a site of biological interest
G = a site of geological interest

Public access
FP = access to footpaths through the site only
NO = no public access to site
PP = public access to part of site
WTPR = Leicestershire and Rutland Wildlife Trust permit required for access
YES = public access to the whole or most of the site

Other classifications
CL = Common land
GCR = Geological Conservation Review
LNR = Local nature reserve
LRWT = Leicestershire and Rutland Wildlife Trust
NCR = Nature Conservation Review
NNR = National nature reserve
NT = National Trust
SAC = Special Area of Conservation
SM = Scheduled monument

Sites

See also 
 List of local nature reserves in Leicestershire
 Leicestershire and Rutland Wildlife Trust

Notes

References

Sources

 
Leicestershire
Sites of Special